William or Bill Swan may refer to:

Sir William Swan, 1st Baronet (1631–1680), of the Swan baronets
Sir William Swan, 2nd Baronet (1667–1712), of the Swan baronets
William Swan (silversmith) (1715–1774), American silversmith
William Swan (missionary) (1791–1866), translator of the Bible into Mongolian
William Swan (physicist) (1818–1894), Scottish physicist
William Graham Swan (1821–1869), American politician
William Turnbull Swan (1828–1875), New Zealand politician
William Swan (British Army officer) (1914–1990), British Army officer and agriculturalist
William Swan (aviation pioneer) (1902–1933), rocketplane entrepreneur
Bill Swan (writer) (born 1939), Canadian children's author
Billy Swan (born 1942), American singer-songwriter
Bill Swan (footballer) (born 1956), Australian rules footballer
Will Swan (musician) (born 1985), American guitarist with post-hardcore band Dance Gavin Dance
Will Swan (footballer) (born 2000), English footballer
Bill Swan, American indie rock musician with Beulah

See also
William Swan Plumer (1802–1880), American clergyman, theologian and author
William Swan Garvin (1806–1883), American newspaper proprietor
William Swan Sonnenschein (1855–1931), British publisher, editor and bibliographer
William Swann (disambiguation)